Statistics of the Primera División de México for the 1949–50 season.

Overview
It was contested by 14 teams, and Veracruz won the championship.

Teams

League standings

Results

Changes
After this season Asturias, Club España, and Moctezuma retired from the league due to differences with the Federation. Necaxa, an old member and who didn't accept professionalism in 1943, re-joined for next season.

References
Mexico - List of final tables (RSSSF)

1949-50
Mex
1949–50 in Mexican football